Goghat Assembly constituency is an assembly constituency in Hooghly district in the Indian state of West Bengal. It is reserved for scheduled castes.

Overview
As per orders of the Delimitation Commission, No. 201 Goghat Assembly constituency (SC) is composed of the following: Goghat I and Goghat II community development blocks

Goghat Assembly constituency (SC) is part of No. 29 Arambagh (Lok Sabha constituency) (SC).

Members of Legislative Assembly

Election results

2021

2016

2011
In the 2011 election, Bishwanath Karak of AIFB defeated his nearest rival Debashish Medda of Congress.

 
  

.# Swing calculated on Congress+Trinamool Congress vote percentages taken together in 2006.

2006
In the 2006 election, Niranjan Pandit of AIFB defeated his nearest rival Bishnupada Pakhira of Trinamool Congress.

 
  

.# Swing calculated on Congress+Trinamool Congress vote percentages taken together in 2006.

2001
In the 2006 election, Niranjan Pandit of AIFB defeated his nearest rival Bishnupada Pakhira of Trinamool Congress.

 
  

.# Swing calculated on Congress+Trinamool Congress vote percentages taken together in 2006.

1977-2006
In the 2006 state assembly elections Niranjan Pandit of Forward Bloc won the Goghat assembly seat (SC) defeating Bishnupada Pakhira of Trinamool Congress. Contests in most years were multi cornered but only winners and runners are being mentioned. Shiba Prasad Malick of Forward Block won the seat five times defeating Congress candidates Haradhan Santra in 2001, Lakshmi Charan Kanri in 1996, Sove Dhara in 1991, Nanu Ram Roy in 1987 and Madan Mohan Medda in 1982. Manuram Roy of Janata Party defeated Arati Biswas of Forward Bloc in 1977.

1951-1972
Madan Mohan Medda of Congress won in 1972 and 1971. Ajit Kumar Biswas of Forward Bloc won in 1969 and 1967. The Goghat seat was not there in 1962 and 1957. In independent India's first election in 1951, Radha Krishna Pal, Independent, won the Goghat seat.

References

Assembly constituencies of West Bengal
Politics of Hooghly district